John Adams was a college football player. He was the first-ever All-American for the Penn Quakers.

References

Penn Quakers football players
American football centers
All-American college football players